The 2021 Israeli Basketball League Cup, for sponsorships reasons the Winner League Cup, is the 16th edition of the pre-season tournament of the Israeli Basketball Premier League. Twelve Israeli Premier League team's will participate except from Elitzur Netanya which chose not to participate in light of the short preparation time available to it.

Bracket

First round

Quarterfinals

Semifinals

Final

References

2021
League Cup